Matilda Rosqvist  (born 16 October 1989) is a Swedish football midfielder who currently plays for AIK. She has played Damallsvenskan football for Sunnanå SK and Djurgårdens IF. She currently plays for AIK Fotboll in the swedish Elitettan.

Career
Rosqvist started her youth career in IFK Österåker.

References

External links 
  (archive)
 
 

1989 births
Living people
Swedish women's footballers
Sunnanå SK players
Djurgårdens IF Fotboll (women) players
Damallsvenskan players
Place of birth missing (living people)
Women's association football midfielders
Elitettan players
Footballers from Stockholm